A Bit o' This & That is a compilation album by Emilie Autumn that includes rarities, b-sides, remixes, covers, and music from her early years. It was released on August 3, 2007 in a limited edition digipak format, with just 3000 copies being distributed worldwide.
It was re-released on February 29, 2008, in a standard digibook format.

Track listing

References

2007 albums
Emilie Autumn albums
B-side compilation albums